Vinayak Bhoir (born 2 September 1988) is an Indian cricketer. He made his List A debut for Mumbai in the 2016–17 Vijay Hazare Trophy on 3 March 2017. He made his first-class debut on 11 January 2020, for Mumbai in the 2019–20 Ranji Trophy.

References

External links
 

1988 births
Living people
Indian cricketers
Mumbai cricketers
Place of birth missing (living people)